Neha Amandeep is an Indian actress and model who acted in television and films.

Biography
Though Amandeep is an actress, she worked as a model too. She appeared in many advertisements including the advertisements of Big Bazaar, Pran and Horlicks. Her first work in television was in Sahara One's television series Sahib Biwi Gulam. In this television series she acted as a child actress.

Amandeep's first film was Hey Prabhu Dekha De was released in 2016. This film was an Odia film. She made her debut in Bangla television arena with Stree in 2016. Then, she appeared in Om Namah Shivay. She also appeared in Star Jalsha's Durga Puja teledrama Durgatinashini Durga in 2018 as Devi Kaushiki.

Amandeep appeared in two television films titled Chore Chore Mastuto Bhai and Jayo Jayo Debi in 2019. She also appeared in Didi No. 1 and Thakumar Jhuli in 2019. Her first Bangladeshi film Prem Chor was released on 6 December 2019. She worked in Sun Bangla's daily soap opera Kone Bou.

Filmography

Television

Film

References

External links
 

Living people
1997 births
Indian actresses
Bengali television actresses
Actresses in Hindi television
Indian television child actresses
Actresses in Bengali cinema
Actresses in Odia cinema
Female models from West Bengal
Indian female models